Roosna-Alliku Landscape Conservation Area is a nature park which is located in Järva County, Estonia.

The area of the nature park is 43 ha.

The protected area was founded in 1981 to protect Roosna-Alliku Springs. In 2005, the protected area was designated to the landscape conservation area.

References

Nature reserves in Estonia
Geography of Järva County